Megachile junodi is a species of bee in the family Megachilidae. It was described by Friese in 1904.

References

Junodi
Insects described in 1904